Vranjt is a village in the former municipality Kastriot, Dibër County, northeastern Albania. At the 2015 local government reform it became part of the municipality Dibër. It is situated at 1100 metres above sea level, five kilometres north of Peshkopi city and seven kilometres from the Macedonian border. In the 2011 census, there were 65 residents.

Places of interest
The ruins of an unknown building
The centre of the village
The forests around the village
The Voleza river
The valleys of Voleza
The old houses

References

Sources
(Book) Familja e Vranjtit

Populated places in Dibër (municipality)
Villages in Dibër County